Scent of a Crime is a 1988 Spanish rural crime drama film directed by Antonio Isasi-Isasmendi consisting of an adaptation of the novel El aire de un crimen by Juan Benet. The cast features Paco Rabal, Maribel Verdú, Chema Mazo, Fernando Rey and Germán Cobos, among others.

Plot 
Set in 1950s Spain, the plot tracks the developments after a corpse belonging to a stranger is found in the village of Bocentellas, located in the territory of 'Región'. Upon the arrival of the magistrate, the corpse has been replaced by a different one.

Cast

Production 
The film is an Isasi PC production. Shooting locations included Calatayud (province of Zaragoza) and the neighbouring .

Release 
The film was presented at the 36th San Sebastián International Film Festival's official selection in September 1988. Distributed by Tripictures, the film was theatrically released in Spain on 28 October 1988.

Reception 
Octavi Martí of El País considered that the overly "flat" cinematography "does not always do justice to the locations and characters", adding up to other flaws that underpin a somewhat "dusty scent" relatable not just to a film set in the 1950s, but to a film shot then too.

Accolades 

|-
| align = "center" | 1988 || 36th San Sebastián International Film Festival || Silver Shell for Best Actor || Fernando Rey ||  || align = "center" | 
|-
| align = "center" | 1989 || 3rd Goya Awards || Best Adapted Screenplay || Gabriel Castro, Antonio Isasi Isasmendi, Jorge R. Álamo ||  || align = "center" | 
|}

See also  
 List of Spanish films of 1988

References 

1988 films
Spanish crime drama films
Films set in Spain
1980s Spanish-language films
Films set in the 1950s
Films shot in the province of Zaragoza
Films based on Spanish novels